Anne M. Gobi is an American state legislator serving in the Massachusetts Senate since January 2015. She previously served in the Massachusetts House of Representatives. She is a Spencer resident and a member of the Democratic Party. She was first elected to the state House in an October 2001 special election. She was elected to the state Senate and was sworn in on January 7, 2015. She succeeded retiring Democrat Stephen Brewer.

She currently serves as the Senate Co-chair of the Joint Committee on Environment, Natural Resources and Agriculture and Joint Committee on Higher Education.

See also
 2019–2020 Massachusetts legislature
 2021–2022 Massachusetts legislature
 2020 Massachusetts Senate election

References
							
							

Living people
Democratic Party members of the Massachusetts House of Representatives
Women state legislators in Massachusetts
People from Spencer, Massachusetts
21st-century American politicians
21st-century American women politicians
Year of birth missing (living people)